Friedrich Julius Reubke (23 March 18343 June 1858) was a German composer, pianist and organist. In his short life, he composed the Sonata on the 94th Psalm in C minor, which is considered to be one of the greatest organ works in the classical repertoire.

Biography

Born in Hausneindorf, a small village in the region of the Harz Mountains, Julius Reubke was the eldest son of organ and piano builder Adolf Reubke (1805-1875). Of Julius's five siblings, two brothers, Emil (1836-1884) and Karl (1840-1860), worked with their father; Emil became a partner in 1860 and owned the company from 1872. His brother Otto (1842-1913) was also a pianist, organist and composer; he prepared the Sonata on the 94th Psalm for its first publication in August 1871. Otto settled in Halle, where he was a professor at the University of Halle, and became its director in 1892. There were also two sisters, Meta and Alma.

Reubke's first musical instruction was in Quedlinburg with Hermann Bönicke (1821-1879). He moved to Berlin in April or October 1851, where he continued his musical education at the conservatory there, which had been founded in November 1850 by Theodor Kullak, with whom he studied piano, Adolf Bernhard Marx, with whom he studied composition, and  Julius Stern. In Berlin, he encountered the Neudeutsche Schule with conductor Hans von Bülow and organist Alexander Winterberger, both associated with Franz Liszt.

When Liszt visited Berlin in December 1855, he arranged, on the recommendation of Bülow, to teach Reubke piano and composition from February 1856 in Weimar, and allowed him to live at the Altenburg house he kept. It was in this environment that Reubke composed his two major works, the Piano Sonata in B-flat minor, which he composed from December 1856 to March 1857, and the Sonata on the 94th Psalm in C minor, for organ, which he finished a month later; he also considered writing an opera. The organ sonata was dedicated to Professor Carl Riedel; its premiere was by Reubke on the Ladegast organ (1853-1855) of Merseburg Cathedral on 17 June 1857. Since its composition, it has been considered one of the pinnacles of the Romantic repertoire.

His health was already in decline at the time of his great compositions: 

He moved to Dresden in December 1857. By this time, he was suffering from worsening tuberculosis, and did not have the energy to play or compose. He moved to the health resort at Pillnitz in May 1858, where he died at the Zum Goldenen Löwen inn a few days later, at the age of 24. He was buried near the church of Maria am Wasser in Pillnitz-Hosterwitz on 7 June.

He was one of Liszt's favourite pupils; after his death, Liszt wrote a letter of sympathy to Reubke's father:

Compositions
Piano Sonata in B-flat minor (1857) - influenced by Liszt's Sonata in B minor
Sonata on the 94th Psalm in C minor (1857) for organ - influenced by Liszt's Fantasy and Fugue on the chorale "Ad nos, ad salutarem undam"Trio in E-flat major for organ (1850)
Mazurka in E major for piano (1856)
Scherzo in D minor for piano (1856)
Adagio in E minor for organ

Lost
Overture
Songs for mezzo-soprano and piano
Chorale-variation on O Haupt voll Blut und WundenSources
Michael Gailit: Julius Reubke (1834-1858), notes to Kevin Bowyer's recording of The 94th Psalm'', Nimbus Records, NI 5361 (1993)

External links 

Reubke family photographs - at reubke-organ.de, the successors of the original Reubke organ building family

1834 births
1858 deaths
19th-century classical composers
19th-century classical pianists
19th-century deaths from tuberculosis
19th-century German composers
19th-century German male musicians
Composers for piano
Composers for pipe organ
German classical organists
German classical pianists
German male classical composers
German pianists
German male pianists
German Romantic composers
Tuberculosis deaths in Germany
Male classical pianists
German male organists
People from Harz (district)
People from the Province of Saxony
Male classical organists
19th-century organists